Neil George Komadoski (born November 5, 1951) is a Canadian former National Hockey League defenceman.

Career 
Komadoski was drafted in the fourth round, 48th overall, of the 1971 NHL Amateur Draft by the Los Angeles Kings. He played in 501 NHL games, scoring 16 goals and 76 assists and recording 632 penalty minutes. He also appeared in 23 playoff games with the Kings, tallying two assists and recording 47 penalty minutes.

Personal life 
Komadoski is the father of current Vancouver Canucks scout and former player Neil Komadoski Jr.

Career statistics

Awards and achievements
“Honoured Member” of the Manitoba Hockey Hall of Fame

External links

1951 births
Living people
Canadian ice hockey defencemen
Ice hockey people from Winnipeg
Los Angeles Kings draft picks
Los Angeles Kings players
Oklahoma City Stars players
Salt Lake Golden Eagles (CHL) players
Springfield Indians players
Springfield Kings players
Winnipeg Jets (WHL) players
Canadian expatriate ice hockey players in the United States